"Teenager of the Year" is a song by Australian band Lo-Tel. It was released in May 2000 as the second single from the band's debut studio album Planet of the Stereos. The song peaked at number 34 in Australia. At the ARIA Music Awards of 2000, the song was nominated for the ARIA Award for Breakthrough Artist – Single, losing out to "Don't Call Me Baby" by Madison Avenue.

Track listing
Australian CD single (MATTCD102)
 "Teenager of the Year" – 4:30
 "Genre Casting" – 3:19
 "Lessons in Spanish" – 1:06
 "Looking for Alibrandi" (trailer) (video) – 2:06

Charts

References

1999 songs
2000 singles
Lo-Tel songs